John Wray may refer to:

John Wray (politician) (born 1971), Texas House of Representatives
John Ray (1628–1705), who wrote his last name as Wray until 1670, English naturalist sometimes referred to as the father of English natural history
Sir John Wray, 2nd Baronet (1586–1655), English politician
Sir John Wray, 3rd Baronet (1619–1664), English politician
John Wray (actor) (1887–1940), American character actor of stage and screen
John Wray (missionary), first pastor of Mission Chapel, New Amsterdam in Guyana
John Wray (novelist) (born 1971), American novelist
John Wray (civil servant) (1782–1869), first Receiver of the London Metropolitan Police
John Griffith Wray (1881–1929), American film director

See also
John Ray (disambiguation)
John Rae (disambiguation)
 Jon Wray (born 1970), English rugby union and rugby league footballer who played in the 1990s and 2000s